Dušan Miletić (born 30 July 1998) is a Serbian professional basketball player for Club Bàsquet Girona of the Liga ACB.

Playing career 
In March 2019, Miletić signed a four-year contract with Partizan Belgrade. He was loaned to Borac Čačak in 2019, 2020, and for the 2020–21 ABA League season.

In August 2022, Miletić signed for Girona after parting ways with KK Partizan.

References

External links 
 Player Profile at eurobasket.com
 Player Profile at realgm.com
 Player Profile at proballers.com
 Player Profile at aba-liga.com

1998 births
Living people
ABA League players
Basketball League of Serbia players
Bàsquet Girona players
Centers (basketball)
KK Borac Čačak players
KK Partizan players
KK Sloga players
Kosovo Serbs
Liga ACB players
Serbian expatriate basketball people in Spain
Serbian men's basketball players
Sportspeople from Mitrovica, Kosovo